Tatlyar (Tatlar) is a rural locality (a selo) and the administrative centre of Tatlyarsky Selsoviet, Derbentsky District, Republic of Dagestan, Russia. The population was 1,510 as of 2010. There are 30 streets.

Geography 
Tatlyar is located 29 km northwest of Derbent (the district's administrative centre) by road. Karadagly and Ullu-Terkeme are the nearest rural localities.

Nationalities 
Azerbaijanis and Dargins live there.

References 

Rural localities in Derbentsky District